Ericeia albangula is a moth in the  family Erebidae. It is found in South Africa, Madagascar, Comoros and  La Réunion.

References
Saalmüller, M. 1880. Neue Lepidopteren aus Madagascar, die sich in Museum der Senckenberg'schen naturforschenden Gesellschaft befinden. - Bericht über die Senckenbergische Naturforschende Gesellschaft in Frankfurt a.M. 1879–1880:258–310.

External links
Africanmoths: Pictures & Distribution map of Erceia albangula

Moths described in 1880
Moths of Madagascar
Moths of the Comoros
Moths of Réunion
Moths of Africa
Ericeia
Lepidoptera of South Africa